Erik Sjoqvist can refer to:

 Erik Sjöqvist (1903 – 1975), director of Swedish Cyprus Expedition
 Erik Sjøqvist (1900 – 1978), a Danish Olympic fencer